Hippocalcin-like protein 1 is a protein that in humans is encoded by the HPCAL1 gene.

The protein encoded by this gene is a member of the neuron-specific calcium-binding proteins family found in the retina and brain. It is highly similar to human hippocalcin protein, and nearly identical to rat and mouse hippocalcin like-1 proteins. It may be involved in the calcium-dependent regulation of rhodopsin phosphorylation, and may be of relevance to neuronal signaling in the central nervous system. There are two alternatively spliced transcript variants of this gene, with multiple polyadenylation sites.

References

Further reading

EF-hand-containing proteins